Gilberto Oliveira Souza Júnior (born 5 June 1989), simply known as Gilberto, is a Brazilian professional footballer who plays as a striker for Cruzeiro.

Club career

Santa Cruz
A Santa Cruz youth graduate, Gilberto made his senior debut on 5 July 2009, coming on as a substitute in a 3–0 Série D away win against CSA. In January 2010, after five first team appearances, he was loaned to Vera Cruz until the end of the year's Campeonato Pernambucano.

After scoring twelve goals in 18 appearances (including four in a 4–1 home routing of Vitória das Tabocas), Gilberto returned to Santa and started to feature more regularly. He became an undisputed starter during the 2011 campaign under Zé Teodoro, scoring twelve goals in the 2011 Pernambucano and being chosen as the best striker in the competition.

Internacional
In May 2011, Gilberto signed a three-year contract with Internacional in the Série A. He made his debut in the category on 28 May, replacing Mario Bolatti in a 1–0 loss at Ceará.

Gilberto scored his first goal in the main category of Brazilian football on 16 November 2011, netting the game's only in a home defeat of Bahia. On 7 July of the following year, after being sparingly used, he was loaned to Sport Recife until May 2013.

After appearing regularly, Gilberto returned to Inter in January 2013. In July, however, he moved to Portuguesa also in a temporary deal; an immediate starter, he finished the season 14 goals for the club.

Toronto FC
On 13 December 2013, Gilberto joined Major League Soccer side Toronto FC for a reported transfer fee of over $3 million, choosing MLS after turning down more lucrative offers from Mexico and Germany. He made his debut with Toronto FC against D.C. United on 22 March 2014, the game ended in a 1–0 home victory.

Entering as a substitute against the Columbus Crew on 31 May 2014, Gilberto recorded an assist on Jermain Defoe's 81st-minute equalizer in an eventual 3–2 win to help his team win the Trillium Cup. On 27 June 2014, Gilberto scored his first goal for Toronto FC against the New York Red Bulls, lashing in a 72nd minute free-kick, after arguing with Defoe as to who would take the kick.

Vasco da Gama (loan)
Due to the arrival of Jozy Altidore, and Sebastian Giovinco in January 2015, both of whom would take up DP slots, after only one season with Toronto, Gilberto was loaned to Brazilian club Vasco da Gama on 20 February 2015. He was the club's top goalscorer during the 2015 Campeonato Carioca with nine goals, but was demoted to a backup option after the arrival of new manager Celso Roth.

Chicago Fire
Vasco de Gama terminated the loan in July 2015, forcing Toronto to release Gilberto. He was claimed off waivers and acquired as a designated player by Chicago Fire on 27 July 2015.

After scoring five goals in his first season – which included a brace against former club Toronto – Gilberto failed to find the net in his second, and his contract with Chicago Fire was mutually terminated on 29 June 2016.

São Paulo
On 15 July 2016, Gilberto signed a contract with São Paulo FC until December 2017. A backup to Andrés Chávez, he only featured in eight matches.

On 12 February 2017, Gilberto scored a hat-trick in 5–2 home routing of Ponte Preta, for the year's Campeonato Paulista. He finished the tournament as the top goalscorer with nine goals, along with William Pottker.

Yeni Malatyaspor
Following a two-year stint with São Paulo, Gilberto joined Süper Lig side Yeni Malatyaspor in Turkey.

Bahia
On 11 June 2018, Gilberto returned to Brazil, signing a six-month contract with Bahia. He signed an extension until the end of 2021, being the lead scorer for the team. On 19 October 2020, he became the all-time leading scorer in goals in the Campeonato Brasileiro for Bahia. On 5 November 2020, Gilberto scored his 50th goal in 113 matches for Bahia, across all competitions.

Al-Wasl
On 9 January 2022, Gilberto signed contract free with Al-Wasl.

Career statistics

Honours

Club
Santa Cruz
Campeonato Pernambucano: 2011

Internacional
Campeonato Gaúcho: 2012, 2013

Vasco da Gama
Campeonato Carioca: 2015

Bahia
Campeonato Baiano: 2019, 2020

Individual
Campeonato Paulista Top scorer: 2017

References

External links
 
 

1989 births
Living people
Sportspeople from Alagoas
Brazilian footballers
Association football forwards
Campeonato Brasileiro Série A players
Campeonato Brasileiro Série D players
Santa Cruz Futebol Clube players
Sport Club Internacional players
Sport Club do Recife players
Associação Portuguesa de Desportos players
CR Vasco da Gama players
São Paulo FC players
Esporte Clube Bahia players
Cruzeiro Esporte Clube players
Major League Soccer players
Toronto FC players
Chicago Fire FC players
Süper Lig players
Yeni Malatyaspor footballers
UAE Pro League players
Al-Wasl F.C. players
Designated Players (MLS)
Brazilian expatriate footballers
Brazilian expatriate sportspeople in Canada
Brazilian expatriate sportspeople in the United States
Brazilian expatriate sportspeople in Turkey
Brazilian expatriate sportspeople in the United Arab Emirates
Expatriate soccer players in Canada
Expatriate soccer players in the United States
Expatriate footballers in Turkey
Expatriate footballers in the United Arab Emirates